Port Howe is a community in the Canadian province of Nova Scotia, located in  Cumberland County. The community is named after William Howe, 5th Viscount Howe.

Parks
Gulf Shore Provincial Park
Heather Beach Provincial Park

References

Port Howe on Destination Nova Scotia

Communities in Cumberland County, Nova Scotia